Oskar Fajfer (born 30 April 1994) is a motorcycle speedway rider from Poland.

Speedway career 
Fajfer first started racing for his home club of Start Gniezno in 2010. He finished 12th in the 2011 Speedway Under-21 World Championship. After spells with Grudziądz, Toruń and Gdańsk he returned to Gniezno for the 2019 season.

He also rides in the Swedish and Danish leagues.

References 

Living people
1994 births
Polish speedway riders